Osnaburg is a type of fabric.  "Osnaburg" can also refer to the following places:

Osnaburg, an archaic English name for the city of Osnabrück in Lower Saxony, Germany, for which the fabric is named.
Osnaburg Township, Stark County, Ohio, a township near Canton, Ohio, in the United States
Mehetia, island in French Polynesia, formerly known as Osnaburg Island

Osnaburgh can refer to:

Dairsie, also called Osnaburgh, a village in Fife, Scotland
Osnaburgh First Nation, the former name of the Mishkeegogamang First Nation in the Kenora District, Ontario, Canada
Osnaburgh House, the house for which the first nation was named
Osnaburgh, Ontario and New Osnaburgh, settlements of the First Nation